Daniel Berta (born 26 November 1992) is a Swedish tennis player. He won the Boys' Singles event at the 2009 French Open.

Career

Junior
In the 2009 French Open, he entered the Boys' Singles as an unseeded player. He defeated 9 seed Facundo Argüello in the first round. He then won against Pablo Carreño Busta and Federico Gaio to reach the quarter finals, where he defeated Richard Becker in straight sets. In the semi finals, he defeated Henri Laaksonen to reach his first ever junior Grand Slam final. He defeated French player and 11 seed Gianni Mina 6–1, 3–6, 6–3 for his first ever junior Grand Slam title.

In the junior 2009 Wimbledon Championships, Berta lost in the third round to American Alexander Domijan 3–6, 3–6.

ATP
He was granted a wildcard into the 2009 Ordina Open, which was his ATP tournament debut. He lost to Belgian qualifier Dick Norman in the first round, 3–6, 3–6. He also received a wildcard into the 2009 Swedish Open, where he lost to Björn Phau in the first round 3–6, 2–6.

Junior Grand Slam finals

Singles: 1 (1 title)

ATP Challenger and ITF Futures finals

Singles: 1 (0–1)

Doubles: 1 (0–1)

References

External links
 
 

1992 births
Living people
French Open junior champions
Sportspeople from Helsingborg
Swedish male tennis players
Grand Slam (tennis) champions in boys' singles
21st-century Swedish people